Ian Sirelius (born 28 October 1987) is a Swedish former professional footballer who played as a winger.

Career

Later career
After nine years at IK Sirius, he left the club at the end of 2019, where his contract expired. Sirelius then announced his retirement from football on 31 January 2020.

After retiring, Sirelius then continued his position as a project manager at Gröndals IK, however to an extended extent, a position he had had for a few years alongside his playing career.

References

External links 
 

Living people
1987 births
Swedish footballers
Association football wingers
Allsvenskan players
Superettan players
Gröndals IK players
IF Brommapojkarna players
IK Sirius Fotboll players
Footballers from Stockholm